Back Lake is a  water body located in Coos County in northern New Hampshire, United States, in the town of Pittsburg. It is part of the Connecticut River watershed. It is situated north of Lake Francis and west of First Connecticut Lake. U.S. Route 3 passes by Back Lake's eastern shore.

The lake is classified as a coldwater fishery, with observed species including brook trout, rainbow trout, brown trout, and brown bullhead.

There are numerous cabins around the lake, and two public boat launch locations.

See also

List of lakes in New Hampshire

References 

Lakes of Coös County, New Hampshire